Pleurotomella vaginata is a species of sea snail, a marine gastropod mollusk in the family Raphitomidae.

Description
The length of the shell attains 5.3 mm.

Distribution
This marine species occurs off Georgia and Florida, USA at a depth of 805 m.

References

External links
 
 Dall, William Healey. "Small shells from dredgings off the southeast coast of the United States by the United States Fisheries Steamer Albatross in 1885 and 1886." Proceedings of the United States National Museum (1927) 

vaginata
Gastropods described in 1927